Peter F. Brungardt (born January 30, 1947) is a former Republican member of the Kansas Senate, representing the 24th district from 2001 to 2013.  His previous political experiences include the Salina City Planning Commission (1986–1991), Salina City Commission (1991–1999), and Mayor of Salina (1993–1994, 1998–1999).

An optometrist, he is married to Rosie Brungardt.

Committee assignments
Brungardt served on these legislative committees:
 Federal and State Affairs (chair)
 Joint Committee on State-Tribal Relations (chair)
 Joint Committee on Corrections and Juvenile Justice Oversight (vice-chair)
 Ethics and Elections
 Calendar and Rules
 Public Health and Welfare

Major donors
Some of the top contributors to Brungardt's 2008 campaign, according to the National Institute on Money in State Politics:
 Kansas Republican Senatorial Committee, Kansas Bankers Association, Senate Republican Leadership Committee of Kansas, Kansas National Education Association, Kansas Contractors Association, Kansas Association of Realtors

Financial, insurance and real estate companies were his largest donor group.

Elections

2012
Brungardt was defeated by Tom Arpke in the August 7, 2012 Republican primary, by a margin of 5,413 to 4,354. Arpke went on to defeat Democratic nominee Janice Norlin in the general election on November 6, 2012.

References

External links
Kansas Senate
Project Vote Smart profile
 Follow the Money campaign contributions
 2000, 2002, 2004, 2006, 2008
 Pete Brungardt on State Surge
 Pete Brungardt on Vote-KS.org

Living people
1947 births
Salus University alumni
American optometrists
Republican Party Kansas state senators
21st-century American politicians
Politicians from Salina, Kansas